Elmer Swenson (12 December 1913 – 24 December 2004) was a pioneering grape breeder who introduced a number of new cultivars, effectively revolutionizing grape growing in the Upper Midwest of the United States and other cold and short-seasoned regions.

Biography 
Elmer Swenson worked on a  farm near Osceola, Wisconsin which he had inherited from his maternal grandfather Larson, an immigrant from Sweden.  Swenson began breeding grapes in 1943, starting a program of intercrossing French hybrid grapes with selections of the local wild species, Vitis riparia. He was inspired by the work of T.V. Munson, a Texas breeder who had documented the American grape species and heavily utilized them in his breeding. Swenson hoped to generate seedlings capable of producing high quality fruit in his climate, something few if any cultivars could do reliably at that time.

For ten years beginning in 1969, Swenson took a job caring for fruit crops at the University of Minnesota, and he began to conduct some of his work there, although the bulk of his breeding program remained at his own farm. His first two hybrids, 'Edelweiss' and 'Swenson Red', were joint releases with the University of Minnesota, but further releases were independently released.

Swenson always maintained a very liberal policy of sharing breeding selections, sending cuttings to just about anyone who asked.  Five of his hybrids were patented, but many more were freely distributed, and many cultivars were even named by other people, which has resulted in a degree of confusion.

Cultivars Developed By Elmer Swenson 
Patented cultivars:
St. Croix
St. Theresa 
St. Pepin
La Crosse
Espirit
Kay Gray

Co-released with University of Minnesota:
Swenson Red
Edelweiss
Minnesota 78

Others:

Kandiyohi
Sabrevois
Norway Red
Alpenglow
Petit Jewel
Prairie Star
Louise Swenson
Lorelei
Trollhaugen
Swenson White
Summersweet
Brianna
Delisle
Montreal Blue (aka 'St. Theresa' and 'Flambeau')
Aldemina
Somerset Seedless
Laura's Laughter
Osceola Muskat aka Muscat de Swenson

References

External links
Swenson Preservation Project
Tribute to Elmer Swenson
Status and Future of the Swenson Hybrids

1913 births
2004 deaths
American horticulturists
American viticulturists
People from Osceola, Wisconsin
American people of Swedish descent
University of Minnesota people